HMS Inverness (M102) was a Sandown-class minehunter of the Royal Navy.  She was decommissioned by the Royal Navy in 2005, and in 2008 became EML Sakala (M314) of the Estonian Navy.

HMS Inverness
Inverness was built by Vosper Thornycroft and launched on 27 February 1990 as one of the 12 ship class of Sandown-class minehunters.

Inverness took part in the major joint service Exercise Saif Sareea II in Oman throughout October 2001, and also trained on her way back from the Gulf as part of the overarching Exercise Argonaut 2001 maritime task group.

In 2003, Inverness was one of a number of Royal Navy warships taking part in a multi-national exercises off Scotland, which involved ships and aircraft from a number of the world's navies, including French, German and American units. HMS Inverness was awarded the Freedom of the City of Inverness in 2004.

In July 2004, the UK Ministry of Defence announced that as part of the restructuring of the Navy, the three oldest Sandown-class minehunters would be retired by April 2005. Inverness was decommissioned in 2005 and was then laid up awaiting a buyer or disposal.  In September 2006, Estonia signed a contract to acquire the three vessels.

After refitting in Rosyth Inverness was formally handed over to the Estonian Navy in April 2007, and renamed .

EML Sakala (M314)

Sakala belongs to the Estonian Mineships Division. She is the fourth vessel of the Estonian Navy Mineships Division and second of three modernized Sandown class minehunters purchased from the Royal Navy.

The coat of arms was presented on a ceremony on 24 January 2008 in Scotland. The ship's name comes from an ancient Estonian county Sakala which is today known as Viljandimaa but is often called Sakalamaa. The arms are a black shield which represents the rich soils of Sakala and ethnic Estonian men's clothing. The rose points towards the capital of Sakalamaa. The swords represent Sakala's important role in the Estonian ancient freedom fight and fighting spirit, as silver stands for loyalty. The ship's motto in Latin is "In nomine libertatis” meaning "In the name of freedom". The coat of arms was designed by Priit Herodes.

In December 2018 Sakala arrived at the Babcock site at Rosyth Dockyard for a series of modifications and upgrades, which included the Thales Sonar 2193 navigation system and the Thales M-CUBE command and control system.

See also
BALTRON project
Mineships Division

References

External links 
 
 

Sandown-class minehunters
Ships built in Southampton
1990 ships
Sandown-class minehunters of the Estonian Navy
Estonian Mineships Division
Minehunters of Estonia